T. Subbarami Reddy (born 17 September 1943) is an Indian industrialist, politician, film producer, and a philanthropist. In 1993 he produced the Sanskrit film Bhagavad Gita, which garnered the National Film Award for Best Feature Film at the 40th National Film Awards.

He is a member of the Indian National Congress. He was Member of the Parliament of India representing Andhra Pradesh in the Rajya Sabha, the upper house of the Indian Parliament and Lok Sabha, the lower house since 1996. He was elected to 11th and 12th Lok Sabha twice in 1996 and 1998 from Visakhapatnam constituency. He was elected as Rajya Sabha member in 2002 and continued in the position for the third term.

He was member of various parliamentary committees. He was also Minister of State in the Ministry of Mines between 2006 and 2008. On 15 June 2012, he lost the election for Nellore constituency to Mekapati Rajamohan Reddy.

Personal life
He was born to T. Babu Reddy and Rukmini Amma at Nellore, Andhra Pradesh. He did B.Sc. in physics from Nizam College, Hyderabad. His uncle is T. Ramana Reddy. He is also related to filmmaker T. Pattabhirama Reddy.

His wife T. Indira Subbarami Reddy is the chairperson of Gayatri Projects Ltd, the company founded by him.

Industrialist
He received a gold medal by the then Prime Minister of India, Indira Gandhi, for his contribution in the construction of the then world's biggest dam Nagarjuna Sagar Project in Andhra Pradesh in 1967. Reddy was the mud contractor for this dam.

He was Chairman of Tirumala Tirupati Devasthanam Board (T.T.D.) since 2004, National Panorama Festival Committee in 1992, National Film Award Jury in 1994 and 1997, Andhra Pradesh Cultural Federation in 1994 and Member of Central Film Censor Board, 1983–85.

Selected filmography
He has produced a handful of films in Bollywood, Telugu, Sanskrit and Tamil languages.
Sanskrit
Bhagavad Gita (1993)

Hindi
Dilwaala (1986) 
Chandni (1989) 
Lamhe (1991) 
Swami Vivekananda (1998)

Telugu
Jeevana Poratam (1986)
Trimurtulu (1988)
State Rowdy (1989)
Surya IPS (1991)
Gangmaster (1994)
Vamshoddharakudu (2000)

Awards
National Film Awards
National Film Award for Best Feature Film (producer) - Bhagavad Gita (1993)

Other honors
Kala Samrat by Maharashtra Government in 1988
Kala Ratna by Lt. Governor, Delhi in 1989
Kala tapaswi by Telugu Academy in 1993
Honorary doctorate by Mangalore University in recognition of social work
Life Time Achievement Award by American Telugu Association in 2002

Awards in his honor
T. Subbarami Reddy Award for contribution to Telugu cinema

See also 
 Rajya Sabha members from Andhra Pradesh

References

External links
 Biographic details

1943 births
Living people
Telugu film producers
Hindi film producers
Businesspeople from Andhra Pradesh
Indian National Congress politicians from Andhra Pradesh
Businesspeople in construction
India MPs 1996–1997
India MPs 1998–1999
Rajya Sabha members from Andhra Pradesh
People from Nellore
Lok Sabha members from Andhra Pradesh
Film producers from Andhra Pradesh
Producers who won the Best Feature Film National Film Award